Dioptis aeliana is a moth of the family Notodontidae first described by Henry Walter Bates in 1862. It is found in lowland sites in Amazonian Brazil.

It is the only known Dioptis species in which the hindwings are almost completely ochreous orange. It is part of a mimicry complex with Brevioleria aelia (the butterfly that led Bates to name the species), Hyposcada illinissa, Napeogenes sylphis, Oleria gunilla and Oleria ilerdina.

References

Moths described in 1862
Notodontidae of South America